The following is a list of Australian podcasts.

List

References

Podcasts

Australian